Ozyptila sincera is a species of crab spider in the family Thomisidae. It is found in Russia (European, Far East), Korea, and Japan.

Subspecies
These three subspecies belong to the species Ozyptila sincera:
 (Ozyptila sincera sincera) Kulczynski, 1926
 Ozyptila sincera canadensis Dondale & Redner, 1975
 Ozyptila sincera oraria Dondale & Redner, 1975

References

sincera
Articles created by Qbugbot
Spiders described in 1926